Alireza Yousefi (born 27 August 2003) is a weightlifter from Iran, who won a gold medal at the 2018 Buenos Aires Youth Olympic Games.

In 2019 he competed at the 2019 World Junior Weightlifting Championships in the over 109 kg category setting 6 youth world records.

He is the world youth weightlifting champion in 2022 and also holds the record for the world super-heavyweight Clean & Jerk in the youth category.

Major results

References

External links

2003 births
Living people
Iranian male weightlifters
Weightlifters at the 2018 Summer Youth Olympics
People from Qaem Shahr
Youth Olympic gold medalists for Iran
Sportspeople from Mazandaran province
21st-century Iranian people
Islamic Solidarity Games competitors for Iran